The sixth season of the American competitive reality television series Hell's Kitchen premiered on Fox on July 21, 2009, and concluded on October 13, 2009. Gordon Ramsay returned as host and head chef, while season two winner Heather West joined to serve as red team sous-chef, Scott Leibfried returned to serve as blue team sous-chef, and Jean-Philippe Susilovic returned to serve as maître d'hôtel. For the first time, the winner of this season received a position as a head chef at Araxi Restaurant in Whistler, British Columbia.

The season was won by executive chef David "Dave" Levey, with fellow executive chef Kevin Cottle being the runner-up, and sous-chef Ariel Contreras-Fox placing third.

Contestants
Initially, sixteen chefs began the competition, and were joined by a seventeenth, Robert Hesse from the previous season, after the first dinner service.

Notes

Contestant progress
Each week, the best member (determined by Ramsay) from the losing team during the latest service period is asked to nominate two of their teammates for elimination; one of these two is meant to be sent home by Ramsay. On some weeks, there is a variation in the nomination process, depending on the losing team's (or even winning team's) performance.

Episodes

Notes

References

External links
 Araxi Restaurant

Hell's Kitchen (American TV series)
2009 American television seasons